Limnophila is a genus of limoniid crane flies in the family Limoniidae. There are at least 280 described species in Limnophila.

Members of the family Limoniidae were previously in a subfamily of Tipulidae which was promoted to family rank.

Species
Subgenus Araucolimnophila Alexander, 1940
L. wolffhuegeli Alexander, 1940
Subgenus Arctolimnophila Alexander, 1966
L. claggi Alexander, 1931
L. subcostata (Alexander, 1911)
Subgenus Atopolimnophila Alexander, 1972
L. laricicola Alexander, 1912
Subgenus Dasylimnophila Alexander, 1965
L. stuckenbergiana Alexander, 1965
L. velitor Alexander, 1951
Subgenus Dendrolimnophila Alexander, 1949
L. albomanicata (Alexander, 1945)
L. shikokuensis Alexander, 1953
Subgenus Elporiomyia Alexander, 1964
L. breviterebra Alexander, 1965
L. crepuscula Wood, 1952
L. nox Alexander, 1921
L. woodiana Alexander, 1964
Subgenus Habrolimnophila Alexander, 1968
L. celestissima (Alexander, 1945)
Subgenus Hesperolimnophila Alexander, 1966
L. euxesta Alexander, 1924
L. nycteris Alexander, 1943
L. rubida Alexander, 1924
Subgenus Hovalimnophila Alexander, 1963
L. malitiosa (Alexander, 1951)
Subgenus Idiolimnophila Alexander, 1934
L. emmelina Alexander, 1914
Subgenus Indolimnophila Alexander, 1968
L. adicia Alexander, 1964
L. benguetana Alexander, 1931
L. bituminosa Alexander, 1931
L. bivittata Edwards, 1928
L. dravidica Alexander, 1971
L. iota Alexander, 1964
L. iotoides Alexander, 1968
L. manipurensis Alexander, 1942
L. subguttularis Alexander, 1932
Subgenus Lasiomastix Osten Sacken, 1860
L. macrocera (Say, 1823)
L. subtenuicornis (Alexander, 1918)
L. tenuicornis Osten Sacken, 1869
Subgenus Limnophila Macquart, 1834
L. abstrusa Alexander, 1929
L. acuspinosa Alexander, 1931
L. allosoma Speiser, 1908
L. alpica Alexander, 1929
L. angularis Alexander, 1929
L. angusticellula Alexander, 1931
L. angustilineata Alexander, 1926
L. antennella Alexander, 1929
L. araucania Alexander, 1928
L. arnoudi Theowald, 1971
L. aureola Skuse, 1890
L. austroalpina Alexander, 1929
L. basalis (Walker, 1856)
L. bathrogramma Alexander, 1929
L. bogongensis Alexander, 1929
L. borchi Alexander, 1929
L. brachyptera Alexander, 1931
L. brunneistigma Alexander, 1931
L. bryobia Mik, 1881
L. buangensis Alexander, 1933
L. campbelliana Alexander, 1932
L. cancellata Alexander, 1962
L. carteri Alexander, 1922
L. casta Alexander, 1928
L. charis Alexander, 1955
L. charon Alexander, 1937
L. chinggiskhani Podenas & Gelhaus, 2001
L. cingulipes Alexander, 1928
L. circumscripta Alexander, 1934
L. clavigera Alexander, 1934
L. colophallus Alexander, 1967
L. defecta Alexander, 1929
L. dictyoptera Alexander, 1922
L. difficilis Alexander, 1920
L. disposita Skuse, 1890
L. dorrigana Alexander, 1933
L. edita Alexander, 1928
L. effeta Alexander, 1922
L. egena Alexander, 1928
L. electa (Alexander, 1924)
L. eutheta Alexander, 1936
L. expressa Alexander, 1937
L. filiformis Alexander, 1929
L. flavissima Alexander, 1960
L. fundata Alexander, 1928
L. guttulatissima Alexander, 1913
L. hemmingseniana (Alexander, 1978)
L. hilli Alexander, 1929
L. hoffmanniana Alexander, 1938
L. humidicola Alexander, 1929
L. imitatrix Skuse, 1890
L. implicita Alexander, 1929
L. inculta Alexander, 1929
L. inordinata Skuse, 1890
L. intonsa Alexander, 1928
L. japonica Alexander, 1913
L. jordanica Alexander, 1949
L. jucunda Alexander, 1928
L. kaieturana Alexander, 1930
L. kershawi Alexander, 1928
L. kerteszi Alexander, 1914
L. latistyla Alexander, 1923
L. lepida lepida Alexander, 1928
L. lepida subtilis Alexander, 1944
L. leucostigma Alexander, 1937
L. levidensis Skuse, 1890
L. litigiosa Alexander, 1928
L. lloydi Alexander, 1913
L. longicellula Alexander, 1931
L. luctuosa Skuse, 1890
L. luteicauda Alexander, 1924
L. madida Alexander, 1928
L. martynovi Alexander, 1933
L. melica Alexander, 1929
L. micromera Alexander, 1979
L. mira Alexander, 1926
L. mirabunda Alexander, 1928
L. miroides Alexander, 1932
L. mitocera Alexander, 1929
L. mitoceroides Alexander, 1933
L. morosa Alexander, 1928
L. morula Alexander, 1928
L. nebulicola Alexander, 1929
L. nebulifera Alexander, 1923
L. nematocera (Alexander, 1939)
L. nemorivaga Alexander, 1929
L. nitidiceps Alexander, 1928
L. nixor Alexander, 1965
L. nocticolor Alexander, 1929
L. novella Alexander, 1928
L. obscura Riedel, 1914
L. obscuripennis Skuse, 1890
L. ocellata Skuse, 1890
L. oiticicai Alexander, 1948
L. oliveri Alexander, 1923
L. otwayensis Alexander, 1934
L. pallidistyla Alexander, 1934
L. pauciseta Alexander, 1924
L. penana Alexander, 1967
L. pergracilis Alexander, 1943
L. perscita Alexander, 1926
L. pictipennis (Meigen, 1818)
L. pilosipennis Alexander, 1922
L. platyna Alexander, 1952
L. politostriata Alexander, 1934
L. polymoroides Alexander, 1929
L. procella Alexander, 1944
L. pullipes Alexander, 1938
L. quaesita Alexander, 1923
L. recedens Alexander, 1931
L. recta Alexander, 1928
L. referta Alexander, 1928
L. reniformis Alexander, 1934
L. roraima Alexander, 1931
L. roraimicola Alexander, 1931
L. rubecula Alexander, 1944
L. schadei Alexander, 1926
L. schranki Oosterbroek, 1992
L. scitula Alexander, 1926
L. serena Alexander, 1928
L. sikorai Alexander, 1921
L. soldatovi Alexander, 1934
L. spinulosa Alexander, 1946
L. subapterogyne Alexander, 1928
L. subcylindrica Alexander, 1928
L. subjucunda Alexander, 1928
L. subtristis Alexander, 1928
L. suspecta Alexander, 1928
L. tasioceroides Alexander, 1933
L. theresiae Alexander, 1945
L. tigriventris Alexander, 1928
L. tonnoiri Alexander, 1926
L. undulata Bellardi, 1861
L. unispinifera Alexander, 1955
L. varicornis Coquillett, 1898
L. vera Alexander, 1933
L. vicaria (Walker, 1835)
Subgenus Nesolimnophila Alexander, 1920
L. grandidieri Alexander, 1920
L. luteifemorata Alexander, 1963
L. malagasya Alexander, 1920
Unplaced
L. bigladia Alexander, 1945
L. bryanti Alexander, 1927
L. byersi Alexander, 1973
L. canifrons Edwards, 1932
L. chilensis Blanchard, 1852
L. decasbila (Wiedemann, 1828)
L. flavicauda (Bigot, 1888)
L. galactopoda Alexander, 1943
L. lobifera Alexander, 1955
L. mcdunnoughi Alexander, 1926
L. micropriapus Alexander, 1981
L. nigrofemorata Alexander, 1927
L. pectinifera Alexander, 1964
L. poetica Osten Sacken, 1869
L. subpilosa Edwards, 1928
L. tetonicola Alexander, 1945

See also
 List of Limnophila species

References

Limoniidae
Tipulomorpha genera
Taxa named by Pierre-Justin-Marie Macquart